Gareth Jones (born 1954) is an English music producer and engineer notable for working with Depeche Mode, Einstürzende Neubauten, Wire and Erasure.

Background
Jones was born in Warrington, Lancashire. He is married and currently living in North London. 
When he was young he played different instruments but became more interested in music technology. He owned a simple valve tape recorder and began experimenting with tape editing. He later trained at the BBC and began working in recording studios, such as Pathway. At Pathway he recorded and mixed John Foxx's Metamatic album in 1980 and the first Madness single, "The Prince", in 1979.
While working with a band in Vienna the band's manager suggested Jones mix the recordings in West Germany. He did the mixing at Hansa Tonstudio in West Berlin. The studio was the most high tech he had worked in. He decided to live in Berlin and began working with many bands at Hansa. Many English bands began recording in Berlin as the exchange rate made it cheaper. At Hansa, Jones began experimenting with recording atmospheres. Bands would play their instruments through large amplifiers which were then recorded with microphones creating a large arena type sound. This sound would catch the attention of bands like Depeche Mode who used this method on many recordings.

Gareth Jones was a pioneer in the use of digital equipment. He introduced sampling to many bands such as Depeche Mode and Einstürzende Neubauten. He began recording with new electronic instruments such as AMS digital delays and the Synclavier sampler synthesiser, which was brought in by Daniel Miller of Mute Records. 
In the mid 1990s he moved back to London and worked in famous studios such as Abbey Road and The Strongroom in London.

Recent endeavors

In 2020, Jones produced several tracks for a new technopop band called Of Love and Lust.

Jones collaborates with American composer/producer/Our Silent Canvas label owner Christopher Bono on Nous Alpha, who release new album A Walk in the Woods in 2021.

In May, 2021, Jones and Daniel Miller, recording as Sunroof, released their debut album Electronic Music Improvisations Vol. 1.

Gear 
Since 2005, Jones has used mostly software for his productions which keeps him more mobile for work. He has an outstanding knowledge of "Logic Audio" music production software.

Hardware gear that he has used on in the past include: Roland 100M Modular System, Akai S-3200 sampler, Waldorf PPG Wave 2.v, the GMedia/M-Tron Mellotron, multiple hardware effects racks, and Revox G36 2-track. Software apps that he has used include: Reaktor, Reason, VST plug-ins, Arboretum Hyperprism, Battery from Native Instruments, FM7, B4, Absynth, ReBirth, Time Designer from SonicWorx, TC Works Mercury-1 and BIAS Peak.

Notable work

References

External links
Official website
Gareth Jones Mixing Tutorial Bonedo.de (German)

English record producers
English audio engineers
Living people
People from Warrington
1954 births